Simphiwe Matanzima (born 18 August 1997) is a South African rugby union player for the  in the United Rugby Championship, and the  in the Currie Cup. His regular position is loosehead prop.

Honours
 Currie Cup winner 2021
 United Rugby Championship runner-up 2021-22

References

South African rugby union players
Living people
1997 births
Xhosa people
People from Queenstown, South Africa
Rugby union props
Bulls (rugby union) players
Blue Bulls players
Rugby union players from the Eastern Cape